Frank R. Uible (January 10, 1895 – January 20, 1974) was a Democratic politician in the U.S. state of Ohio who was in the Ohio House of Representatives, and served as Speaker of the House 1937–1939.

Biography

Frank R. Uible was born to William D. and Ida (Stouder) Uible of Leesburg, Ohio. He attended public schools and entered the Ohio Wesleyan University, graduating in 1919. During the First World War he was a first lieutenant in the Third Officers Training Camp.

Uible graduated from the Case Western Reserve University School of Law in 1927, and began practice in Cleveland, Ohio. He opened his own office in downtown Cleveland in 1930. In 1932, he was elected to the Ohio House of Representatives, serving on the Judiciary Committee. He was re-elected in 1934, and was Democratic floor leader of the House, and re-elected again in 1936, serving as Speaker of the House for two years.

Uible was a member of the Cleveland and Ohio State Bar associations, and was Phi Delta Phi. He married Laura Michalske of Cleveland on July 30, 1932.

References

Speakers of the Ohio House of Representatives
Democratic Party members of the Ohio House of Representatives
Politicians from Cleveland
Ohio lawyers
1895 births
1974 deaths
Ohio Wesleyan University alumni
Case Western Reserve University alumni
20th-century American politicians
Lawyers from Cleveland
People from Highland County, Ohio
20th-century American lawyers